Don Schaly (October 10, 1937 – March 9, 2005) was an American baseball coach. He was the baseball coach at Marietta College in Ohio for 40 years, from 1964 to 2003.

Schaly, a native of Ellwood City, Pennsylvania, retired following the 2003 season after 40 years at the helm of the Marietta baseball program. On March 9, 2005, he died of cancer while attending the Pioneers' Spring Trip in Venice, Florida.

The 1959 graduate of Marietta College played baseball and football for the Pioneers. He returned to his alma mater in 1964 and never left, guiding his teams to three NCAA Division III National Championships and seven National Runner-up finishes. He won 18 Mideast Regional Championships and 27 Ohio Athletic Conference Championships.

The coach won numerous coaching awards during his career. He was inducted into the American Baseball Coaches Association (ABCA) Hall of Fame in 1995. Schaly was named the National Coach of the Year four times (1975, 1981, 1983 and 1986) and in 2000 Collegiate Baseball named him the Division III Coach of the Century. Schaly was also awarded the OAC's Coach of the Year 17 times and the Mideast Regional Coach of the year 21 times.

Schaly's final record at Marietta is 1,442–329, but Schaly's role in the Marietta College Athletics Department extended far beyond the duties of head baseball coach. He was an assistant football coach for 17 years and served as an assistant athletics director for more than 20 years. Schaly also played a primary role in the formation of the Marietta College Athletic Hall of Fame, which he was inducted into in 2004.

Schaly was honored on November 8, 2003, at a banquet to celebrate his accomplishments at Marietta. He became the first person in Marietta College history to have his jersey retired. The college also renamed the main entrance of Ban Johnson Arena the Schaly Lobby in his honor.  In 2006, Pioneer Park was renamed Don Schaly Stadium in his honor.

Head coaching record

 * National Champs

See also
 List of college baseball coaches with 1,100 wins

References

1937 births
2005 deaths
Baseball coaches from Ohio
Marietta Pioneers baseball coaches
Marietta Pioneers baseball players
Marietta Pioneers football coaches
Marietta Pioneers football players
Pennsylvania State University alumni
People from Ellwood City, Pennsylvania
Players of American football from Pennsylvania
Baseball coaches from Pennsylvania
Deaths from cancer in Florida
National College Baseball Hall of Fame inductees